Draba cacuminum is a species of flowering plant belonging to the family Brassicaceae.

It is native to Norway.

References

cacuminum